La Sagrera-Meridiana,  simply known as La Sagrera, is an interchange complex underneath Avinguda Meridiana, in the Barcelona district of Sant Andreu, in Catalonia, Spain. It consists of a Rodalies de Catalunya station and three Barcelona Metro stations. The Rodalies de Catalunya station is located in the Meridiana Tunnel on the Lleida to Barcelona via Manresa railway, between Sant Andreu Arenal and Arc de Triomf, and is operated by Renfe Operadora. The Barcelona Metro stations are on lines 1 (L1) and 5 (L5), as well as the northern section of line 9/10 (L9 Nord/L10), and are operated by Transports Metropolitans de Barcelona (TMB). On the L1, the station is between Navas and Fabra i Puig, on the L5 between Camp de l'Arpa and Congrés, and on the L9/L10 between Plaça Maragall (future) and Sagrera - TAV (under construction). The station is also projected to become the terminus of the L4 once the extension from La Pau opens. A number of interurban bus services stop near the station.

Station layout

Rodalies de Catalunya
The Rodalies de Catalunya railway station was opened on 16 February 2011 and entered in service on 20 February. It is located under Avinguda Meridiana, between Hondures and Martí Molins streets. It has one access at each side of the station, one of them used by TMB too. The upper level has a hall equipped with ticket vending machines and a left-luggage office. On the lower level there are two platforms where the trains run.

Barcelona Metro
 Barcelona Metro line 1 station was opened in 1954 with the opening of the line between Navas and this station. The station is located under Avinguda Meridiana, between Hondures and Garcilaso streets. The upper level of the station has two halls, one of them connected to Barcelona Metro line 5 and Rodalies de Catalunya railway station. They are equipped with ticket vending machines and a TMB Information Center.
 Barcelona Metro line 5 station was opened in 1959 with the opening of the line between Vilapicina and this station. The station is located under Avinguda Meridiana, between Felip II and Garcilaso streets. It has two halls equipped with ticket vending machines and connected to L1 and L9/L10 metro station.
 Barcelona Metro line 9/10 station was opened in June 2010 with the opening of the line between Bon Pastor and this station. Temporarily L9 and L10 use what will be the future L4 tunnel, when this line will arrive at the station. The station is located under the intersection of Avinguda Meridiana and Felip II street. It is divided in three levels: the upper hall, the upper platform and lower platform. The upper hall is used together with line 5 and is equipped with ticket vending machines and a TMB Control Center. On the upper platform run all the trains that stop in the station because the lower platform is currently closed.

References

External links
 
 La Sagrera-Meridiana listing at the Rodalies de Catalunya website
 The Barcelona Metro stations (L1, L5, L9 and L10) listing at the Transports Metropolitans de Barcelona website

Railway stations in Spain opened in 2011
Transport in Sant Andreu
Barcelona Metro line 1 stations
Barcelona Metro line 5 stations
Barcelona Metro line 9 stations
Barcelona Metro line 10 stations
Rodalies de Catalunya stations
Railway stations in Barcelona
Railway stations in Spain opened in 1954
Railway stations in Spain opened in 1957
Railway stations in Spain opened in 2010
Railway stations located underground in Spain